RNIE 4 is a national highway of Benin. It joins the RNIE 2 at Bohicon.

Cities and towns
Bohicon

References

Roads in Benin